James Jameson (1824–1896) was a New Zealand mayor. 

James Jameson may also refer to:

 James Jameson (priest) (1828–1899), Archdeacon of Leighlin
 James Jameson (British Army officer) (1837–1904), British army surgeon
 James Jameson Dickson (1815–1885), Scottish Swedish logging industrialist and philanthropist

See also

 James Jamerson (disambiguation)
 James Jamieson (disambiguation)